Propolis is a genus of fungi in the family Rhytismataceae. The genus contains about 14 species.  This is not to be confused with bee propolis, also known as 'bee glue', which is a byproduct of an active beehive and is not a fungus.

Species
Propolis angulosa
Propolis farinosa
Propolis hillmanniana
Propolis lecanora
Propolis leonis
Propolis lugubris
Propolis phacidioides
Propolis pulchella

References

External links
 

Leotiomycetes